Schedothrips is a genus of thrips in the family Phlaeothripidae.

Species
 Schedothrips orientalis
 Schedothrips tumidus

References

Phlaeothripidae
Thrips
Thrips genera